Abdellatif Hammouchi (born 1966 in Taza, Morocco) is the head of the Moroccan national police directorate, the General Directorate for National Security or DGST (French: Direction Générale de la Sureté Nationale) as well as head of secret services, the General Directorate for Territorial Surveillance or DGST (Formerly known as the DST).
He is also an advisor to Mohammed VI on terrorism-related affairs.

Controversies
On 20 February 2014, while Hammouchi was attending a meeting with French officials in Paris, he was summoned by a French judge to testify on torture cases after multiple complaints by torture victims, such as Zakaria Moumni, against him and his organisation. His name has been often cited in connection to secret detention centres in Morocco such as the Temara interrogation centre and the Ain Aouda secret prison.

In Morocco lawsuits against the DST and Hammouchi in connection to the death of detainees under torture have been rejected for lack of evidence.

In April 2011, Moroccan journalist Rachid Niny was imprisoned after he published sensitive details about Abdellatif Hammouchi. 
In 2011, Hammouchi received an Alaouite Wissam decoration from Mohammed VI in recognition of his efforts for maintaining security.

Early life
He graduated from the University of Sidi Mohammed Ben Abdallah in Fes and joined the police as an officer in 1993. After Hamidou Laanigri left the DST a day after the Casablanca bombings of 16 May 2003 and was appointed as the Director of the General Directorate for National Security, he was replaced by his deputy Ahmed Harrari, who was replaced by Hammouchi in December 2005.

Decorations 
  Officer of the Order of the Throne (2011)
  Officer of the Legion of Honour of France (2016)
  Grand-Cross of the Order of Merit of the Civil Guard of Spain (2019)

See also
Fouad Ali El Himma
Yassine Mansouri
Abdelkader Belliraj

References

Moroccan police officers
1966 births
Living people
People from Fez, Morocco
Advisors of Mohammed VI of Morocco
Directors of intelligence agencies
Moroccan civil servants
Sidi Mohamed Ben Abdellah University alumni
Torture in Morocco
People of Moroccan intelligence agencies